Foundry Square is a complex of four architecturally-linked, 10-story mid-rise buildings located at Howard and First Streets near the Transbay Transit Center in the South of Market neighborhood of San Francisco, California. Each of the four buildings stands on a different corner of the street.

Each building is a mixed-use structure. The design team included STUDIOS Architecture, Jim Jennings Architecture, Page & Turnbull, Webcor Builders, and landscape architect SWA Group. The developer was Wilson Equity Office (now Wilson Meany). The Glazing Contractor used on these buildings was AGA (Architectural Glass and Aluminum). Current tenants include the law firm of Orrick, Herrington & Sutcliffe, STUDIOS Architecture, the headquarters of Slack, and the NASDAQ Entrepreneurial Center.

The project's first phase, Foundry Square II (405 Howard Street) and Foundry Square IV (500 Howard Street), was completed in 2003.  The third building, Foundry Square I (400 Howard Street), was completed in 2007.  In April 2012, Tishman Speyer acquired the entitlements to the final building, Foundry Square III (505 Howard Street), from Wilson Meany Sullivan, and broke ground later that year. Foundry Square III was completed in April 2014.

The  contained within Foundry Square's four open corners form a larger, unified public square. Each building's  dual-glaze glass walls frame the square, establishing an arcade that defines the transition between interior building space and public exterior spaces. The four corners of the intersection are integrated by the use of public art and sculpture (such as Richard Deutsch's "Time Signature" stainless steel sculpture), tree bosques, ground-floor cafes, and over-scaled pots. The project earned SWA Group the ASLA Northern California Chapter Merit Award in 2006.

Notes

External links
 STUDIOS Architecture
 Foundry III

Office buildings in San Francisco
Buildings and structures in San Francisco
South of Market, San Francisco